The 1987 European Tour was the 16th official season of golf tournaments known as the PGA European Tour.

The season was made up of 27 tournaments counting for the Order of Merit, and several non-counting "Approved Special Events".

The Order of Merit was won by Wales' Ian Woosnam.

Changes for 1987
There were several changes from the previous season, with the addition of the Moroccan Open and the German Masters, the return of the Belgian Open, and the loss of the Car Care Plan International.

Schedule
The following table lists official events during the 1987 season.

Unofficial events
The following events were sanctioned by the European Tour, but did not carry official money, nor were wins official.

Order of Merit
The Order of Merit was based on prize money won during the season, calculated in Pound sterling.

Awards

See also
List of golfers with most European Tour wins

Notes

References

External links
1987 season results on the PGA European Tour website
1987 Order of Merit on the PGA European Tour website

European Tour seasons
European Tour